The Ceylon Mercantile Union (CMU) is one of the largest trade unions in the commercial sector in Sri Lanka.

The Ceylon Mercantile, Industrial and General Workers Union was originally built in 1928 as a white-collar union in the mercantile sector. Victor Corea and A.E. Goonesinha were respectively the inaugural President and secretary of the CMU.

After Bala Tampoe became its general secretary in February 1948, it came under the influence of the Lanka Sama Samaja Party.

Trade unions in Sri Lanka

Trade unions established in 1928